Gaya Singh (1943 – 7 October 2017) was an Indian Communist leader, an organiser of working class and a parliamentarian.

Life 
Com. Gaya Singh entered politics as a student leader in late 60s and became the general secretary of AISF in Bihar and one of the national secretaries of AISF. He later worked as an organiser of working class and became the National President of AITUC. He was a leader of Bihar unit of the Communist Party of India. He even worked as one of the  national level secretaries of CPI. He served as a member of Rajya Sabha twice (from 8 July 1992 to 7 July 1998 and 8 July 1998 to 7 July 2004).

References

1943 births
2017 deaths
Bihari politicians
Communist Party of India politicians from Bihar
20th-century Indian politicians